Henry Joseph Grimmelsmann (December 22, 1890 – June 26, 1972) was an American prelate of the Roman Catholic Church. He served as the first bishop of the new Diocese of Evansville in Indiana from 1944 to 1965.

Biography

Early life 
Henry Grimmelsmann was born on December 22, 1890, in Cincinnati, Ohio, to G.H. and Frances Grimmelsmann. Raised in the Price Hill neighborhood of Cincinnati, he was one of ten children; three of his sisters became nuns and another brother also became a priest. As a child he attended Holy Family School, where one of his classmates was future Bishop Urban Vehr. 

Grimmelsmann studied at St. Gregory Preparatory Seminary in Cincinnati (1904-1907) and at St. Joseph's College in Rensselaer, Indiana (1907-1909). He then entered the University of Innsbruck in Austria, but was forced to return to Cincinnati following the outbreak of World War I.

Priesthood 
Grimmelsmann was ordained to the priesthood for the Archdiocese of Cincinnati by Archbishop Henry K. Moeller on August 15, 1915. After his ordination, Grimmelsmann studied at the Catholic University of America in Washington, D.C. and later returned to the University of Innsbruck, from where he earned a Doctor of Sacred Scripture degree. After returning to Cincinnati, he served as a curate at St. Lawrence Parish. From 1920 to 1932, Grimmelsmann became vice-rector and professor of Sacred Scripture and Hebrew at Mount St. Mary's Seminary. Pope Pius XI named him rector of the Pontifical College Josephinum at Worthington, Ohio, in 1932.

Bishop of Evansville 
On November 11, 1944, Grimmelsmann was appointed the first bishop of the newly erected Diocese of Evansville by Pope Pius XII. He received his episcopal consecration on December 21, 1944, from Archbishop Amleto Cicognani, with Bishops Urban Vehr and George Rehring serving as co-consecrators. Between 1962 and 1965, Grimmelsmann attended all four sessions of the Second Vatican Council in Rome. 

Pope Paul VI accepted Grimmelsmann's resignation as bishop of Evansville on October 18, 1965 and named time titular bishop of Tabla.  Henry Grimmelsmann died in Evansville on June 26, 1972 at age 81, and was buried at St. Joseph Cemetery in Evansville.

See also

References

1890 births
1972 deaths
Saint Joseph's College (Indiana) alumni
University of Innsbruck alumni
Catholic University of America alumni
Religious leaders from Cincinnati
Participants in the Second Vatican Council
Roman Catholic bishops of Evansville
20th-century Roman Catholic bishops in the United States